Kamareh District is a district (bakhsh) in Khomeyn County, Markazi Province, Iran. At the 2006 census, its population was 14,734, in 3,887 families.  The District has one city: Qurchi Bashi. The District has two rural districts (dehestan): Chahar Cheshmeh Rural District and Khorram Dasht Rural District.

References 

Khomeyn County
Districts of Markazi Province